Sean P. Lawler served as Chief of Protocol of the United States from December 2017 until July 2019.

Career 
Prior to assuming the role of Chief of Protocol, he was a master chief petty officer in the U.S. Navy and was the director for Visits, Planning, and Diplomatic Affairs at the National Security Council. Before that, he led the Office of Visits and Protocol at the U.S. Cyber Command in Fort Meade, Maryland. A veteran with more than 20 years of service in the U.S. Navy, Lawler capped his military service as the Director of Administration at the Naval Support Facility Thurmont (Camp David) in Thurmont, Maryland. Earlier, he was the Administrative Department Leading Chief Petty Officer and Ship's Secretary on the USS John C. Stennis and he was an Executive Assistant to the Commander, U.S. Pacific Fleet, Pearl Harbor, Hawaii.

Chief of Protocol
Lawler was sworn in as Chief of Protocol on December 1, 2017, with the rank of Ambassador. As part of his work, he led the Office of Protocol at the U.S. State Department to welcome visiting dignitaries to the United States. He also traveled with the president to facilitate foreign trips.

In June 2019, Lawler was accused of intimidating behavior towards staff and became the subject of an investigation by the State Department's Office of the Inspector General. He was suspended indefinitely on June 24, at which time his deputy, Mary-Kate Fisher, took over as Acting Chief of Protocol. Lawler resigned on July 9, 2019.

Personal life
Lawler was born and raised on the southwest side of Chicago. As of 2019, he resides in Maryland.

References

Chiefs of Protocol of the United States
Living people
Military personnel from Chicago
Trump administration personnel
United States Navy sailors
University of Maryland Global Campus alumni
Year of birth missing (living people)